The 2023 Davis Cup is the 111th edition of the Davis Cup, a tournament between national teams in men's tennis. It is sponsored by Rakuten. It is part of the 2023 ATP Tour calendar.

Davis Cup Finals

Date: 12–17 September 2023 (group stage)21–26 November 2023 (knockout stage)
Venue: Martin Carpena Arena, Málaga, Spain (knockout stage)
Surface: Hard indoor

16 nations will take part in the finals. The qualification will be as follows:
 2 finalists of the 2022 Finals (Australia and Canada)
 2 wild card teams (Italy and Spain)
 12 winners of the qualifying round, in February 2023

TH = Title-Holder, 2022F = Finalist from the 2022 tournament, WC = Wild Card

Qualifying round

Date: 3–5 February 2023

Twenty-four teams will play for twelve spots in the Finals, in series decided on a home and away basis.

These twenty-four teams are:
 12 teams ranked 3rd–16th in the 2022 Finals except the 2 wild card teams
 12 winning teams from 2022 World Group I

The 12 winning teams from the qualifying round will play at the Finals and the 12 losing teams will play at the World Group I.

#: Nations Ranking as of 28 November 2022.

Qualified teams

Seeded teams
  (#1)
  (#3)
  (#5)
  (#6)
  (#9)
  (#10)
  (#11)
  (#12)
  (#13)
  (#14)
  (#15)
  (#17)

Unseeded teams
  (#18)
  (#19)
  (#21)
  (#22)
  (#24)
  (#27)
  (#28)
  (#29)
  (#30)
  (#31)
  (#33)
  (#40)

World Group I

Date: 14–17 September 2023

Twenty-four teams participated in the World Group I, in series decided on a home and away basis.

These twenty-four teams are:
 12 losing teams from qualifying round, in February 2023
 12 winning teams from World Group I Play-offs, in February 2023

#: Nations Ranking as of 6 February 2023.

Seeded teams
  (#5)
  (#14)
  (#16)
  (#18)
  (#19)
  (#22)
  (#23)
  (#24)
  (#25)
  (#26)
  (#27)
  (#28)

Unseeded teams
  (#29)
  (#30)
  (#31)
  (#33)
  (#34)
  (#35)
  (#36)
  (#37)
  (#38)
  (#39)
  (#41)
  (#42)

Play-offs

Date: 3–5 February 2023

Twenty-four teams played for twelve spots in the World Group I, in series decided on a home and away basis.

These twenty-four teams are:
 12 losing teams from 2022 World Group I
 12 winning teams from 2022 World Group II

The 12 winning teams from the play-offs will play at the World Group I and the 12 losing teams will play at the World Group II.

#: Nations Ranking as of 28 November 2022.

Qualified teams

Seeded teams
  (#20)
  (#23)
  (#25)
  (#26)
  (#32)
  (#34)
  (#35)
  (#36)
  (#37)
  (#38)
  (#39)
  (#41)

Unseeded teams
  (#43)
  (#44)
  (#45)
  (#47)
  (#48)
  (#49)
  (#51)
  (#55)
  (#56)
  (#63)
  (#70)
  (#72)

World Group II

Date: 14–17 September 2023

Twenty-four teams participated in the World Group II, in series decided on a home and away basis.

These twenty-four teams are:
 12 losing teams from World Group I Play-offs, in February 2023
 12 winning teams from World Group II Play-offs, in February 2023

#: Nations Ranking as of 6 February 2023.

Seeded teams
  (#32)
  (#40)
  (#43)
  (#44)
  (#45=)
  (#45=)
  (#47)
  (#48)
  (#49)
  (#50)
  (#51)
  (#52)

Unseeded teams
  (#53)
  (#54)
  (#55)
  (#56)
  (#57)
  (#58)
  (#59)
  (#60)
  (#61)
  (#62)
  (#63)
  (#65)

Play-offs

Date: 2–6 February 2023

Twenty-four teams played for twelve spots in the World Group II, in series decided on a home and away basis.

These twenty-four teams are:
 12 losing teams from 2022 World Group II
 12 teams promoted from their 2022 Group III zone:
 3 from Europe
 3 from Asia/Oceania
 3 from Americas
 3 from Africa

The 12 winning teams from the play-offs will play at the World Group II and the 12 losing teams will play at the 2024 Group III of the corresponding continental zone.

#: Nations Ranking as of 28 November 2022.

Qualified teams

Seeded teams
  (#42)
  (#46)
  (#50)
  (#52)
  (#53)
  (#54)
  (#57)
  (#58)
  (#59)
  (#60)
  (#61)
  (#62)

Unseeded teams
  (#64)
  (#65)
  (#66)
  (#67)
  (#68)
  (#69)
  (#71)
  (#73)
  (#74)
  (#76)
  (#77)
  (#84)

Group III
The top three nations of each continental zone will be promoted to the 2024 World Group II Play-offs and the last two nations will be relegated to the 2024 Group IV.

Americas zone

Date: TBC
Venue: TBC

Participating teams

 
 
 
 
 
 
 
 
 

Promotions/Relegations
 , and  qualify for the 2024 Davis Cup World Group II Play-offs

Asia/Oceania zone

Date: TBC
Venue: TBC

Participating teams

Europe zone

Date: TBC
Venue: TBC

Participating teams

Africa zone

Date: TBC
Venue: TBC

Participating teams

Group IV
The top two nations of each continental zone will be promoted to the 2024 Group III and the last two nations from the Asia/Oceania and Africa zone will be relegated to the 2024 Group V.

Americas zone

Date: TBC
Venue: TBC

Participating teams

 
 
 
 
 
 
 
 
 
 

Inactive team

Asia/Oceania zone

Date: TBC
Venue: TBC

Participating teams

Europe zone

Date: TBC
Venue: TBC

Participating teams

 
 
 
 
 
 
 

Inactive teams

  (suspended)
  (suspended)

Africa zone

Date: TBC
Venue: TBC

Participating teams

Group V
The top two nations of each continental zone will be promoted to the 2024 Group IV.

Asia/Oceania zone

Date: TBC
Venue: TBC

Participating teams

 
 
 
 
 
 
 
 
 
 
 
 
 
 

Inactive team

  (suspended)

Africa zone

Date: TBC
Venue: TBC

Participating teams

 
 
 
 
 
 
 
 
 
 
 
 

Inactive teams

References

External links
Official website

 
Davis Cup
Davis Cups by year